Eugene Richard Martini (1915-January 23, 1965) was an American landscape architect and landscape planner.

Biography

Martini received his B.F.A. in Landscape Architecture from the University of Illinois in 1939. Martini spent the early part of his career as a land planning consultant working with the Federal Housing Administration (FHA) in Chicago and Atlanta from 1941 to 1946 before forming Eugene R. Martini and Associates, Landscape Architects and Planning Consultants, in Atlanta, Georgia. His work focused on community planning, parks, subdivisions, mobile homes courts, and federal initiatives that addressed the military family housing shortage following World War II. He was a design consultant for the southeastern region of the Public Housing Administration, an active member of American Society of Landscape Architects and a consultant to the book Landscape Planning published by Better Homes and Gardens in 1963.

Martini helped establish a community of landscape architects in Atlanta throughout the 1950s and early 1960s and mentored Edward Daugherty, FASLA who worked in the office during his summer's while studying at Harvard's GSD (1948–1951). Daugherty noted that other landscape architects  in Atlanta working on similar projects at the time included H. Boyer Marx and Willard Byrd. From 1963-1965, Martini was Second Vice President of the American Society of Landscape Architects and participated in various other memberships throughout his career including the American Institute of City Planners, the American Society of Planning Officials, the Urban Land Institute, the Georgia Engineering Society, the American Planning and Civic Association, and the Atlanta Chamber of Commerce.

Projects 
This list is a very incomplete list of Martini's projects, but available documentation suggests the following:
Master Plan for Aiken Estates, South Carolina (1953) 
Original design of Bagley Park (now Frankie Allen) in Atlanta, Georgia (1954) 
Park Road Shopping Center (1956), one of Charlotte's oldest shopping centers, located at the intersection of Park and Woodlawn roads. (Drawings, 1953, 1956, UNCC MANUSCRIPT COLLECTION, 210) 
Cocoa Isles Masterplan, Florida (1957) published in Geoffrey and Susan Jellicoe's magnum opus, The Landscape of Man described as 'man-made ecosystems....that must absorb the peculiarities and idiosyncrasies of man.'
Contribution to Tuxedo Park in Buckhead, Atlanta, Georgia 
Tower Mobile Homes Court, Leesville, Louisiana (1960) with Edwards and Portman, AIA (published in an article by Eugene Martini, 'Mobile Homes, Immobile Landscape, or: Who said you can't take it with you?'  Landscape Architecture v50, Fall 1960)

Published work

Landscape Planning
Landscape Planning, 1963, (Des Moines, Iowa: Meredith Books).
A book edited and published by Better Homes & Gardens includes work by Thomas Dolliver Church. Organized around seven chapters and a home portfolio, the book highlights recent trends in landscape design to make the best use of the yard with low maintenance examples to create livable gardens that increase convenience, privacy, beauty and pleasure. Convenience is meant to make things easier, 'a gate wide enough for both the wheelbarrow and your knuckles!' asserted Martini. Privacy is the choice to control what we do in our daily lives, for example, getting the morning paper in your bathrobe. Beauty is the principal reward and goal when planning the composition of your garden.  Last, pleasure is 'the feeling that all things are "right with the world."' (10-12).

Mobile Homes, Immobile Landscape
'Mobile Homes, Immobile Landscape, or: Who said you can't take it with you?' Landscape Architecture v50, Fall 1960.
In this article Martini recognized the growing industry of mobile homes and the challenge to the landscape architect to place them within a community. In the end, he questioned 'What can the landscape architect do?' to help the impoverished landscape of mobile home courts and asserted:

He can design better communities for mobile-home owners. He can devise more delightful and interesting ways to site the units. He can use this small residential unit to meet desired densities and yet minimize grading to preserve trees. The tight efficiency of the mobile-home core could be the seed from which might grow a better way of life. Herein may lie the clue and herein lies a challenge. Beyond his drafting board contribution, he can help his clients find sites and analyze their suitability; he can help work out problems with local planning authorities, and through collaboration with civil engineers, electrical engineers, and building architects, he can create beautiful communities in lieu of uncoordinated chaos.

Twenty thousand dollars per acre is cheap
'Twenty thousand dollars per acre is cheap' Landscape Architecture v49 no4, Summer 1959, 226-229.
This article describes the challenges of planning a subdivision in the Buckhead area along Peachtree Road in Atlanta, Georgia.

Other Writings
Martini also wrote numerous articles for the Journal of the American Institute of Architects, American Builder, and American City

References 

American landscape architects
University of Illinois College of Fine and Applied Arts alumni
1915 births
1965 deaths